Sarah Jessica Parker is an American actress and television producer who has been acting in film, television and theater since the 1970s. She is known for her role as Carrie Bradshaw on the HBO television series Sex and the City (1998–2004), for which she won two Emmy Awards, four Golden Globe Awards for Best Actress in a Comedy Series and three Screen Actors Guild Awards. The character was widely popular during the airing of the series and was later recognized as one of the greatest female characters in American television. She later reprised the role in films Sex and the City (2008) and Sex and the City 2 (2010), as well as the television show And Just Like That... (2021–present).

She made her first major film appearances in the 1984 dramas Footloose and Firstborn. Her other film roles include The Ryan White Story (1989), L.A. Story with Steve Martin (1991), Honeymoon in Vegas with Nicolas Cage (1992), Hocus Pocus with Bette Midler (1993), Ed Wood with Johnny Depp (1994), The First Wives Club again with Midler (1996), The Family Stone with Diane Keaton (2005), Failure to Launch with Matthew McConaughey (2006), Did You Hear About the Morgans? with Hugh Grant (2009), and New Year's Eve with Abigail Breslin (2011).

In 2012, Parker returned to television for the first time since Sex and the City, portraying Isabelle Wright in three episodes of the musical television series Glee. She starred as Frances Dufresne in the HBO series Divorce alongside Thomas Haden Church (2016–2019), for which she was nominated for a Golden Globe Award. Since 2005, she has run her own production company, Pretty Matches, which has been creating content for HBO and other channels.

Parker made her Broadway debut at the age of 11 in the 1976 revival of The Innocents, before going on to star in the title role of the Broadway musical Annie in 1979.

As an actress

Film

Television

Theatre

As a producer

See also
List of awards and nominations received by Sarah Jessica Parker

References

External links

Actress filmographies
American filmographies